Dodgeville may refer to:

Dodgeville, Iowa
Dodgeville, Michigan
Dodgeville, Wisconsin, a city
Dodgeville (town), Wisconsin, a town adjacent to the city